The Bliggspitze is a mountain in the Kaunergrat group of the Ötztal Alps in Austria. It has a summit elevation of 3,454 m above sea level.

See also
 List of mountains of the Alps

External links
 "Bliggspitze" on Mountain-Forecast

Mountains of Tyrol (state)
Mountains of the Alps
Alpine three-thousanders
Ötztal Alps
Glaciers of the Alps